Raphaël Bienvenu Sabatier (11 October 1732 – 19 July 1811) was a French anatomist and surgeon born in Paris.

He studied medicine in Paris, and in 1756 became a professor at the Collège Royal de Chirurgie. Shortly afterwards, he became chief surgeon at the Hôtel des Invalides, and in 1795 was a professor at the École de Santé. Sabatier was a member of the French Academy of Sciences, and was a consultant-surgeon to Napoleon Bonaparte.

Sabatier was the author of De la médecine opératoire, a popular surgical treatise in its day, and Traité complet d'anatomie, a three-volume work on anatomy. He was an early practitioner of medical percussion, a procedure he used in the diagnosis of empyema.

Written works 
 Mémoire sur les nerfs de la dixième paire, (1776).
 Mémoire sur quelques particularitiés de la structure du cerveau et de ses enveloppes, (1776).
 De la médecine opératoire, ou des opérations de Chirurgie qui se pratiquent le plus fréquemment, Paris, Didot le Jeune, 1796.
 Traité complet d'anatomie, ou, Description de toutes les parties du corps humain, Théophile Barrois le Jeune, 1798.

References 

  A New General Biographical Dictionary (biographical information]
 Open Library (list of publications)

1732 births
1811 deaths
Scientists from Paris
French anatomists
French surgeons
Members of the French Academy of Sciences
Burials at Père Lachaise Cemetery